Lacy is an unincorporated community in Trinity County, Texas.  In 1930 Lacy had a church, school, cemetery, and a few houses.  The population was 44 as of 2000.

Unincorporated communities in Texas